Medalen is a surname. Notable people with the surname include:

Linda Medalen (born 1965), Norwegian footballer
Rune Medalen (born 1970), Norwegian footballer